Based in Connecticut, Commonfund is an American asset management firm founded in 1971 with a seed grant from the Ford Foundation. As a private nonprofit organization, the firm manages customized investment programs for endowments, foundations, public pension funds, and other mission-driven institutions. The organization has additional offices in New York City, San Francisco, London, and Beijing.

Along with Yale University CIO David F. Swensen, Commonfund helped pioneer applying the "endowment model" of investing to institutional investor portfolios. As of 2021, Commonfund had approximately US$28 billion in assets under management. Commonfund is currently the second-largest manager of outsourced endowment assets in the U.S. (surpassed only by the Vanguard Group).

Commonfund also operates the Commonfund Institute, which provides the investment management field with investment research and professional development programs such as the Commonfund Benchmark Studies, the Commonfund Higher Education Price Index (HEPI), the Commonfund Forum, and the Investment Stewardship Academy. The company is active in the fields of responsible and impact investing as well.

References

External links 
 Commonfund Institute

1971 establishments in Connecticut
Non-profit organizations based in Connecticut
Investment management companies of the United States